SRM University may refer to one of several universities in India:

 SRM Institute of Science and Technology, formerly SRM University, in Tamil Nadu
 SRM University, Andhra Pradesh
 SRM University, Haryana
 SRM University, Sikkim